Loving Every Minute is the fourth studio album by American country music artist Mark Wills. Released in 2001 on Mercury Nashville Records, the album produced two singles: the title track and "I'm Not Gonna Do Anything Without You" (a duet with Jamie O'Neal), which peaked at #18 and #31, respectively, on the Billboard Hot Country Singles & Tracks (now Hot Country Songs) charts. The album itself reached a peak of #10 on the Billboard Top Country Albums charts, and #93 on The Billboard 200.

Content
The album's title track, written by Tom Shapiro, Michael White and Monty Criswell, was its first single as well. It peaked at #18 on the country charts in 2002. Following this song was the only other single, "I'm Not Gonna Do Anything Without You", which was co-written by Randy VanWarmer and Pirates of the Mississippi member Rich Alves. This song was also included on O'Neal's debut album Shiver.

"Somebody" can also be found on Reba McEntire's 2003 album Room to Breathe. McEntire's rendition of the latter song was a Number One hit for her in 2004. Also, John Berry recorded "The Balloon Song" and released it as a single in 2007 from his album Those Were the Days.

Track listing

Personnel
Mark Wills: Lead Vocals
John Wesley Ryles: Background Vocals
Jamie O'Neal: Guest Vocals On "I'm Not Gonna Do Anything Without You"
Brent Mason: Electric Guitar, Acoustic Guitar
Paul Franklin: Steel Guitar
Aubrey Haynie, Stuart Duncan: Fiddle
Aubrey Haynie: Mandolin
Brady Barnett, Gordon Mote, Gary Prim, Keith Stegall: Keyboards
Gary Prim: Piano
Glenn Worf: Bass guitar
Eddie Bayers: Drums
Eric Darken: Percussion
John Kelton, Scott Williamson: Drum Programming

Chart performance

References

2001 albums
Mercury Nashville albums
Mark Wills albums
Albums produced by Carson Chamberlain